Huanca (possibly from Aymara for a very big stone,  or from Quechua for rock) is a  mountain in the Chila mountain range in the Andes of Peru. It is located in the Arequipa Region, Castilla Province, Chachas District. Huanca lies southwest of Huayllatarpuna and Condorcacha and northeast of Chinchón and Aceruta.

References

Mountains of Peru
Mountains of Arequipa Region